Pinball and Other Stories is a compilation album by Brian Protheroe. It was released by EMI in 2006.

Track listing

originally from Pinball

1. "Pinball"
2. "Goodbye Surprise"
3. "Money Love"
4. "Changing My Tune"
5. "Fly Now"
6. "Monkey"

originally from Pick Up

7. "Enjoy It"
8. "Oh, Weeping Will"
9. "Running Through The City"
10. "Soft Song"
11. "Pick-Up"

originally from I/You

12. "I/You"
13. "Dancing On Black Ice"
14. "Never Join The Fire Brigade"
15. "Hotel"
16. "The Face And I"

originally from Unreleased

17. "Thick And Creamy"
18. "Cold Harbour"

originally from Citysong

19. "Holyoke Hotel"

References

2006 compilation albums